The Rosamond Coursen and Walter R. Reed House is a house located in southwest Portland, Oregon listed on the National Register of Historic Places.

It has also been known as the Rosa Reed House.

See also
 National Register of Historic Places listings in Southwest Portland, Oregon

References

Houses on the National Register of Historic Places in Portland, Oregon
Individually listed contributing properties to historic districts on the National Register in Oregon
Portland Historic Landmarks
Queen Anne architecture in Oregon
Southwest Portland, Oregon